The Men's downhill competition at the FIS Alpine World Ski Championships 2019 was held on Saturday, 9 February.

In the final event of his international career, Aksel Lund Svindal won the silver medal, two-hundredths of a second behind compatriot and training partner Kjetil Jansrud.

Results
The race was delayed an hour due to weather and started at 13:30 CET (UTC+1) under mostly cloudy  skies.

References

Men's downhill
2019